Lapsley is a surname, originating in Scotland. It may refer to:

David Lapsley (1924–2001), Scottish football player (St. Mirren)
John Lapsley KBE, CB, DFC, AFC, RAF (1916–1995), World War II fighter pilot; later a senior Royal Air Force commander
John Lapsley (footballer) (born 1951), Scottish football player (Airdrieonians)
Låpsley, a British singer-songwriter and electronic music artist
Michael Lapsley SSM (born 1949), South African Anglican priest and social activist
Phil Lapsley (born 1965), electrical engineer, hacker, and entrepreneur
Samuel Norvell Lapsley (1866–1892), American Presbyterian missionary partner of William Henry Sheppard in the Congo

See also
Lapsley W. Hamblen Jr. (1926–2012), judge of the United States Tax Court